James Patrick Briscoe (14 October 1923 – 27 August 2014) was a professional footballer, manager and one of the founding members of Stevenage F.C.

Biography
Born in Swinton, West Riding of Yorkshire, Briscoe came through the youth team at Sheffield Wednesday. A centre forward, he scored three goals in five league appearances during the 1946–47 season, but left to join non-League Gainsborough Trinity. He later moved to Kent, playing for Ramsgate and Margate, where he broke the goalscoring record for the Kent League.

In 1968 he became manager of the newly formed Stevenage Athletic and its successor club Stevenage Borough.

References

1923 births
People from Swinton, South Yorkshire
English footballers
Sheffield Wednesday F.C. players
Gainsborough Trinity F.C. players
Ramsgate F.C. players
Margate F.C. players
English football managers
Stevenage F.C. non-playing staff
2014 deaths
Association football forwards
Kent Football League (1894–1959) players